Jiří Novotný (born 7 April 1970 in Prague) is a former Czech professional footballer defender. He played for Czechoslovakia and later the Czech Republic, for both he played total 33 matches and scored 2 goals.

Novotný was a participant in the 2000 UEFA European Championship.

In his country he played for most of his career with Sparta Prague.

International career

International goals
Scores and results list Czech Republic's goal tally first.

References

External links
 
 
 
 Profile at kazan-sport.narod.ru, Russian
 Interview with Jiri Novotny, Russian
 

1970 births
Living people
Footballers from Prague
Association football midfielders
Czech footballers
Czech expatriate footballers
Czech Republic international footballers
Czechoslovak footballers
Czechoslovakia international footballers
UEFA Euro 2000 players
Czech First League players
Slovak Super Liga players
Russian Premier League players
AC Sparta Prague players
FC Slovan Liberec players
FC Rubin Kazan players
FK Baník Most players
FK Chmel Blšany players
FK Dukla Prague players
MFK Ružomberok players
Expatriate footballers in Slovakia
Expatriate footballers in Russia
Czech expatriate sportspeople in Slovakia
Czech expatriate sportspeople in Russia